Julio Antonio Gastón Durán Neumann (20 March 1918 – 27 November 1990), was a Chilean lawyer and politician. He ran for President in 1964 against Eduardo Frei Montalva and Salvador Allende. He was a member of the Radical Democracy Party, which advocated ideas taken from Classical liberalism and Radicalism. Duran was a State Deputy (1945–1957) and State Senator (1957–1973).

1918 births
1990 deaths
People from Malleco Province
Chilean people of Extremaduran descent
Radical Party of Chile politicians
Radical Democracy (Chile) politicians
Deputies of the XL Legislative Period of the National Congress of Chile
Deputies of the XLI Legislative Period of the National Congress of Chile
Deputies of the XLII Legislative Period of the National Congress of Chile
Senators of the XLIII Legislative Period of the National Congress of Chile
Senators of the XLIV Legislative Period of the National Congress of Chile
Senators of the XLV Legislative Period of the National Congress of Chile
Senators of the XLVI Legislative Period of the National Congress of Chile
Chilean anti-communists
20th-century Chilean lawyers
Chilean expatriates in the United States